Liocarcinus marmoreus, sometimes known as the marbled swimming crab, is a species of crab found in the northern Atlantic Ocean and North Sea. L. marmoreus is sometimes parasitised by the barnacle Sacculina.

References

Portunoidea
Crustaceans of the Atlantic Ocean
Crustaceans described in 1814